Karsten Fonstad  (8 July 1900 – 1970) was a Norwegian politician.

He was born in Ringsaker to Johannes Fonstad and Mathea Kristiansen. He was elected representative to the Storting for the periods 1934–1936 and 1937–1945, for the Labour Party.

References

1900 births
1970 deaths
20th-century Norwegian politicians
People from Ringsaker
Labour Party (Norway) politicians
Members of the Storting
Hedmark politicians